Antonio López Portillo de Guadalupe O.F.M.  (born 11 May 1679 in Guadalajara – 6 January 1742) was a Mexican clergyman and bishop for the Roman Catholic Diocese of Comayagua. He became ordained in 1727. He was appointed bishop in 1725. He died on 6 January 1742, at the age of 62.

References

Mexican Roman Catholic priests
1679 births
1742 deaths
People from Guadalajara, Jalisco
Franciscan bishops
18th-century Roman Catholic bishops in Honduras
Roman Catholic bishops of Comayagua